The yellow-bellied slider (Trachemys scripta scripta) is a land and water turtle belonging to the family Emydidae. This subspecies of pond slider is native to the southeastern United States, specifically from Florida to southeastern Virginia, and is the most common turtle species in its range. It is found in a wide variety of habitats, including slow-moving rivers, floodplain swamps, marshes, seasonal wetlands, and permanent ponds. Yellow-bellied sliders are popular as pets.

Description
The carapace (upper shell) is typically brown and black, often with yellow stripes. The skin is olive green with prominent patches of yellow down the neck and legs. As the name implies, the plastron (bottom shell) is mostly yellow with black spots along the edges. Adults tend to grow darker as they age. Yellow-bellied sliders are often confused with eastern river cooters, who also have yellow stripes on the neck and yellow undersides, but the latter lack the green spots characteristic of this species. The yellow belly often has an "s"-shaped yellow stripe on its face. They also have markings shaped like question marks on their bellies. Females of the species reach a larger body size than the males do in the same populations.

Mating can occur in spring, summer, and autumn. They have polygynandrous mating behavior. Courtship consists of biting, foreclaw display, and chasing.  Yellow-bellied sliders are capable of interbreeding with other T. scripta subspecies, such as red-eared sliders, which are commonly sold as pets. The release of non-native red-eared sliders into local environments caused the state of Florida to ban the sale of red-eared sliders in order to protect the native population of yellow-bellied sliders. 

Yellow-bellied slider movement is highly instigated by dry seasons, where they can be found traveling terrestrially to locate a new water source. One study also found movement is also highly motivated by reproductive recruitment. Differences between male and female movements were observed. Males were more active than females in spring to the end of autumn. Males also exhibited more terrestrial and aquatic movements than females. Finally, long periods of movements were exclusively males.

Mating takes place in the water. Suitable terrestrial area is required for egg-laying by nesting females, who will normally lay 6–10 eggs at a time, with larger females capable of bearing more. The eggs incubate for 2–3 months and the hatchlings will usually stay with the nest through winter. Hatchlings are almost entirely carnivorous, feeding on insects, spiders, crustaceans, tadpoles, fish, and carrion. As they age, adults eat less and less meat, and up to 95% of their nutritional intake eventually comes from plants.

The slider is considered a diurnal turtle; it feeds mainly in the morning and frequently basks on shore, on logs, or while floating, during the rest of the day. At night, it sleeps on the bottom or on the surface near brush piles. Highest densities of sliders occur where algae blooms and aquatic macrophytes are abundant and are of the type that form dense mats at the surface, such as Myriophyllum spicatum and lily pads (Nymphaeaceae). Dense surface vegetation provides cover from predators and supports high densities of aquatic invertebrates and small vertebrates, which offer better foraging than open water.

Some common predators of the yellow-bellied slider include raccoons, opossums, red foxes, and skunks. Other than predators, yellow-bellied sliders are susceptible to respiratory infections which can cause wheezing, drooling, or puffiness in the eyes and is commonly caused by bacteria.  Additionally, these turtles can develop fungal spores that can lead to shell rot, they can also develop metabolic bone disease which can stunt the growth of their shells and cause them to be more brittle and prone to damage 

The lifespan of yellow-bellied sliders is over 30 years in the wild, and over 40 years in captivity.

Since yellow-bellied sliders are long-lived organisms, they require high survivorship to maintain stable populations. They are particularly susceptible to negative effects associated with anthropogenic habitat modification such as increased presence of human-subsidized predators and increased road mortality. Recruitment could also be decreased in populations in highly urbanized areas due to a decrease in habitat connectivity and potential nesting sites.

As pets

Housing

Baby yellow-bellied sliders may be kept in a fairly small tank (20 to 40 gallons), but as they age,  after about three years, they will require much more space. The turtles require enough water to turn around, with a depth of  recommended. Water temperature should be kept between 72 and 80 °F (22–27 °C) and properly filtered. Keeping fish with turtles is usually avoided due to the risk that the turtle will eat the fish. Sliders need a basking area that is kept warm during the day and that will allow the turtle to move around, balance, and dry off completely. This area should average 89–95 °F (32–35 °C) and can be heated with a UV-A heat lamp. A second lamp that produces UV-B is absolutely essential for the turtle to metabolize calcium properly. Direct, unfiltered sunlight is preferable. The lamps should be switched on during daylight hours.

Diet
Pond plants such as elodea (anacharisan) and cabomba can also be left in the water, while human-consumed vegetables such as romaine lettuce, escarole and collard greens must be changed daily. As sliders are omnivores, insects and freshly killed fish may also be provided for protein. Commercially processed animal-based reptile food may be given too, but any sort of leftovers should be immediately removed to prevent fouling the water or turtle's habitat.

Gallery

See also 
 Red-eared slider × yellow-bellied slider sometimes called yellow-eared slider

References

External links

Trachemys
Reptiles of the United States